Zack T. Young was an American college football player and coach. He served as the head football coach at Louisiana Industrial Institute—now known as Louisiana Tech University—in 1906, compiling a record of 2–1–3. Prior to coaching, Young was a starting quarterback for his alma mater.

Head coaching record

References

Year of birth missing
Year of death missing
American football quarterbacks
Louisiana Tech Bulldogs football coaches
Louisiana Tech Bulldogs football players